Bob McGrath from Sesame Street  is a studio album released by Bob McGrath in 1970 on Affinity LP record A-1001.  The album features Bob singing compositions by Robert Allen, who produced the album.  Arrangements were by Stuart Scharf, and Don Casale was the recording engineer.  Stereo Dimension Records distributed the album. In 2021, a digital edition of the album was released by Reservoir Media.

Reception
Billboard Magazine called the album "educational and entertaining for all ages" and praised McGrath's warmth and sensitivity.  Billboard then listed this album on its "Action Records" list on August 1, 1970. Two weeks later, it entered the Billboard Top LPs chart, where it peaked at No. 126, staying on the chart for eleven weeks.

Track listing

References

1970 albums
Sesame Street albums